The Nightingale Island finch (Nesospiza questi) is a species of bird in the family Thraupidae (formerly in Emberizidae).

It is endemic to Nightingale Island of the Tristan da Cunha archipelago where its natural habitats are temperate shrubland and subantarctic grassland. It is threatened by habitat loss.

References

Nightingale Island finch
Nightingale Island finch
Nightingale Island finch